More Blank Than Frank/Desert Island Selection is a 1986 compilation album of music by the British ambient musician Brian Eno. More Blank Than Frank is the title given to the vinyl LP release, and Desert Island Selection is the name used for the CD version. Both were issued at the same time, though they differ somewhat in the ordering and in the songs that were used.

The album was a compilation of many of Eno's earlier solo works, ranging from 1973's Here Come the Warm Jets to 1978's Music for Airports. The LP release contained a wider range of tunes, including a couple of darker and rock-ier songs ("The Great Pretender" and "King's Lead Hat") from his early years. The CD release in comparison contained a significantly lopsided version of Eno's earlier works, eschewing the harder, rock-ier numbers entirely for softer, "proto-ambient" pieces, concluding with a six-minute edit of his first, fully realized ambient piece "1/1", derived from Music for Airports. At the time of release in 1986 the CD version was significant in that it was the only CD version then available of any of Eno's earlier works.

The LP/CD release was accompanied by the release of the book More Dark Than Shark, by Russell Mills, which used the lyrics of Eno's songs as the inspiration for the set of lithographs contained within the book.

Track listing

Desert Island Selection CD release
"Here He Comes"  – 5:37
"Everything Merges With the Night"  – 4:02
"I'll Come Running (To Tie Your Shoes)"  – 3:38
"On Some Faraway Beach" (edit)  – 3:38
"Spirits Drifting"  – 2:39
"Back in Judy's Jungle"  – 5:16
"St. Elmo's Fire"  – 2:59
"No One Receiving"  – 3:51
"Julie With..."  – 5:51
"Taking Tiger Mountain"  – 5:23
"1/1" (edit)  – 6:08

More Blank Than Frank LP release
"Here He Comes"
"Everything Merges With the Night"
"I'll Come Running (To Tie Your Shoes)"
"On Some Faraway Beach"
"Taking Tiger Mountain"
"Backwater"
"St. Elmo's Fire"
"No One Receiving"
"The Great Pretender"
"King's Lead Hat"

More Blank Than Frank Cassette release
"Here He Comes"
"Everything Merges With the Night"
"On Some Faraway Beach"
"I'll Come Running (To Tie Your Shoes)"
"Julie With..."
"Taking Tiger Mountain"
"Backwater"
"St. Elmo's Fire"
"No One Receiving"
"The Great Pretender"
"Back in Judy's Jungle"
"King's Lead Hat"

References

External links

Brian Eno compilation albums
1986 compilation albums
E.G. Records compilation albums